Werra-Suhl-Tal is a town and a municipality in the Wartburgkreis district of Thuringia, Germany. It was created on 1 January 2019 by the merger of the municipalities of Berka/Werra, Dankmarshausen, Dippach and Großensee. Its name refers to the rivers Werra, Suhl (Weihe) and Suhl (Werra).

References

Wartburgkreis